Omri Glazer (born 11 March 1996) is an Israeli football player who plays for Hapoel Be'er Sheva in the Israeli Premier League and Israel national team.

Early life
Glazer was born and raised in Tel Aviv, Israel, to an Israeli family of Ashkenazi Jewish descent.

International career
In November 2016 he received his first call-up to the senior Israel squad for the match against Albania.

Honours

Club
Maccabi Haifa 
 Premier League (1): 2020–21

Hapoel Be'er Sheva
State Cup (1): 2021–22
Super Cup (1): 2022

individual
 Goalkeeper of the season in the Premier League (1): 2021–22

See also 
 List of Jewish footballers
 List of Jews in sports
 List of Israelis

References

External links
 

1996 births
Living people
Israeli Ashkenazi Jews
Israeli Jews
Israeli footballers
Jewish footballers
Hapoel Ra'anana A.F.C. players
Maccabi Haifa F.C. players
Sektzia Ness Ziona F.C. players
Hapoel Be'er Sheva F.C. players
Israeli Premier League players
Footballers from Tel Aviv
Association football goalkeepers
Israel under-21 international footballers